Nicolas Blanchard (born May 31, 1987) is a Canadian former professional ice hockey player who played in the National Hockey League with the Carolina Hurricanes. He was selected in the 6th round, 192nd overall, by the Hurricanes in the 2005 NHL Entry Draft.

Playing career

Blanchard while on the Albany River Rats was involved in a bus crash which took him to hospital in a serious condition and injured five members of the team.

Although Blanchard played 9 games with the Hurricanes during the 2012-13 NHL Season, he spent the rest of his career within the organization playing for its AHL affiliate (initially the River Rats, then the Charlotte Checkers).

After the 2013–14 season with the Checkers, Blanchard became an unrestricted free agent and did not re-sign with the team. He signed a one-year AHL contract with the St. John's IceCaps on October 9, 2014. In the 2014–15 season, Blanchard established a checking line role, contributing with 14 points in 63 games.

An un-signed free agent into the 2015–16 season, Blanchard belatedly signed a contract with the Norfolk Admirals of the ECHL on November 27, 2015. He featured in 4 games with the Admirals, before opting to end his professional career on December 7, 2015.

Career statistics

References

External links

1987 births
Living people
Albany River Rats players
Canadian ice hockey left wingers
Carolina Hurricanes draft picks
Carolina Hurricanes players
Charlotte Checkers (2010–) players
Chicoutimi Saguenéens (QMJHL) players
French Quebecers
Norfolk Admirals (ECHL) players
Ice hockey people from Quebec
People from Granby, Quebec
St. John's IceCaps players